Delavan may refer to a community in the United States:

Delevan, California, formerly Delavan
Delavan, Illinois
Delavan, Kansas
Delavan, Minnesota
Delavan, Wisconsin, a city
Delavan (town), Wisconsin, a town
East Delavan, Wisconsin, an unincorporated community
Delavan Lake, Wisconsin, a census-designated place
Delavan Township, Illinois
Delavan Township, Faribault County, Minnesota

See also
 Delevan (disambiguation)